Gaf, or gāf, can be the name of different Perso-Arabic letters, all representing . They are all forms of the letter kāf, with additional diacritics, such as dots and lines. There are four forms, each used in different places:

  in Perso-Arabic alphabet 
  in the Jawi script
  in the Pegon script
 in Moroccan Arabic and Berber languages
 in Algerian Arabic, Tunisian Arabic and Berber languages
 in Pashto
  in Sindhi and Saraiki

In Tunisia and Algeria,  or   used.

  is preferred in the Levant (nowadays), and by Aljazeera TV channel to be used instead to represent  e.g. هونغ كونغ (Hong Kong) and غاندالف (Gandalf). Foreign publications and TV channels in Arabic, e.g. Deutsche Welle, and Alhurra, follow this practice.

Gaf with line 

 is based on kāf with an additional line. It is rarely used in Arabic itself, but may be used to represent the sound  when writing other languages.
It is frequently used in Persian, Pashto, Uyghur, Urdu and Kurdish and is one of four Perso-Arabic letters not found in Arabic.

/ can also be used to represent  in Morocco.

Gaf with single dot above 

 is derived from a variant form of kāf with the addition of a dot. It is not used in the Arabic language itself, but is used in the Jawi script of Malay to represent a voiced velar stop . Unicode includes two forms on this letter: one based on the standard Arabic kāf, and one based on the variant form . The latter is the preferred form.

Gaf with a dot or three dots below 

They are not used in the Arabic language itself, but are used in the Pegon script of Indonesian languages and in the Arwi alphabet of the Tamil language to represent a voiced velar stop , respectively.

Gaf with line and two dots 

 is derived from a variant form of kāf with the addition of a line and two dots.

Gaf with three dots 

It is used in Berber and Moroccan Arabic to represent . Examples of its use include city names (such as Agadir ,) and family names (such as El Guerrouj ,).

Gaf with ring 

In Pashto for :

Kaf with inverted stroke 

In Chechen, ⟨⟩ is alternatively used as well.

Afrikaans gin 

Character encoding

See also 

References

External links 
 Notes on some Unicode Arabic characters: recommendations for usage (PDF)

Gaf